The nominations for the 17th Vancouver Film Critics Circle Awards, honoring the best in filmmaking in 2016, were announced on December 16, 2016. Manchester by the Sea led with six nominations, when Moonlight with four and La La Land with three nominations.

The winners were announced on December 20, 2016. Manchester by the Sea won five awards, including Best Film.

Winners and nominees

International

Best Film
 Manchester by the Sea
 La La Land
 Moonlight

Best Director
 Kenneth Lonergan – Manchester by the Sea
 Damien Chazelle – La La Land
 Denis Villeneuve – Arrival

Best Actor
 Casey Affleck – Manchester by the Sea
 Ryan Gosling – La La Land
 Denzel Washington – Fences

Best Actress
 Isabelle Huppert – Elle
 Amy Adams – Arrival
 Natalie Portman – Jackie

Best Supporting Actor
 Mahershala Ali – Moonlight
 Jeff Bridges – Hell or High Water
 Lucas Hedges – Manchester by the Sea

Best Supporting Actress
 Michelle Williams – Manchester by the Sea
 Viola Davis – Fences
 Naomie Harris – Moonlight

Best Screenplay
 Kenneth Lonergan – Manchester by the Sea
 Barry Jenkins – Moonlight
 Taylor Sheridan – Hell or High Water

Best Foreign-Language Film
 Toni Erdmann
 Elle
 The Handmaiden

Best Documentary
 Cameraperson
 13th
 O.J.: Made in America

Canadian

Best Canadian Film
 Hello Destroyer
 Werewolf
 Window Horses

Best Director of a Canadian Film
 Kevan Funk – Hello Destroyer
 Ashley McKenzie – Werewolf
 Isiah Medina – 88:88

Best Actor in a Canadian Film
 Jared Abrahamson – Hello Destroyer
 Chen Gang – Old Stone
 Andrew Gillis – Werewolf

Best Actress in a Canadian Film
 Bhreagh MacNeil – Werewolf
 Deragh Campbell – Never Eat Alone
 Tatiana Maslany – The Other Half

Best Supporting Actor in a Canadian Film
 Kurt Max Runte – Hello Destroyer
 Joe Buffalo – Hello Destroyer
 Martin Dubreuil – Shambles (Maudite poutine)

Best Supporting Actress in a Canadian Film
 Molly Parker – Weirdos
 Hannah Gross – Unless
 Julia Sarah Stone – The Unseen

Best Screenplay of a Canadian Film
 Ann Marie Fleming – Window Horses
 Kevan Funk – Hello Destroyer
 Ashley McKenzie – Werewolf

Best Canadian Documentary
 The Prison in Twelve Landscapes
 After the Last River
 We Can't Make the Same Mistake Twice

Best First Film by a Canadian Director
 Werewolf
 Hello Destroyer Never Eat Alone

Best British Columbia Film
 Hello Destroyer
 Aim for the Roses
 Koneline: Our Land Beautiful
 Window Horses

References

External links
 

2016
2016 film awards
2016 in Canadian cinema
2016 in British Columbia